Oreohelix is a genus of air-breathing land snail, a terrestrial pulmonate gastropod mollusk in the family Oreohelicidae.

Oreohelix is the type genus for the family Oreohelicidae.

There are about 79 species in this genus. They are native to the western United States, especially the Rocky Mountains, Great Basin, and Southwest.

Species 
Species within the genus Oreohelix include:
Oreohelix alpina – alpine mountainsnail
Oreohelix amariradix – Bitter Root mountainsnail
Oreohelix anchana – Ancha mountainsnail
Oreohelix barbata – bearded mountainsnail
Oreohelix californica – Clark mountainsnail
 Oreohelix carinifera – keeled mountainsnail
Oreohelix concentrata – Huachuca mountainsnail
Oreohelix confragosa – Pinos Altos mountainsnail
Oreohelix elrodi – carinate mountainsnail
Oreohelix eurekensis – Eureka mountainsnail
Oreohelix hammeri – Seven Devils mountainsnail
Oreohelix handi – spring mountainsnail
 Oreohelix haydeni – lyrate mountainsnail
Oreohelix hendersoni – pallid mountainsnail
Oreohelix howardi – Mill Creek mountainsnail
Oreohelix idahoensis – costate mountainsnail
Oreohelix intersum – Deep Slide mountainsnail
Oreohelix jaegeri – Kyle Canyon mountainsnail
 Oreohelix jugalis – Boulder Pile mountainsnail
Oreohelix junii – Grand Coulee mountainsnail
Oreohelix magdalenae – Magdalena mountainsnail
Oreohelix metcalfei – Black Range mountainsnail
 Oreohelix nevadensis – Schell Creek mountainsnail
 Oreohelix peripherica – Deseret mountainsnail
 Oreohelix peripherica peripherica (Ancey, 1881)
 Oreohelix peripherica wasatchensis (Binney, 1886)
Oreohelix pilsbryi – Mineral Creek mountainsnail
Oreohelix pygmaea – pygmy mountainsnail
Oreohelix socorroensis – Socorro mountainsnail
 Oreohelix strigosa – rocky mountainsnail
 Oreohelix subrudis – subalpine mountainsnail
Oreohelix swopei – Morgan Creek mountainsnail
Oreohelix tenuistriata – thin-ribbed mountainsnail
 Oreohelix vortex – vortex banded mountainsnail
 Oreohelix waltoni – lava rock mountainsnail
Oreohelix yavapai – Yavapai mountainsnail

References

Further reading 
 

Oreohelicidae
Taxonomy articles created by Polbot